The 1993–94 season of the Norwegian Premier League, the highest bandy league for men in Norway.

Ten games were played, with 2 points given for wins and 1 for draws. Stabæk won the league, whereas Skeid was relegated.

League table

References

Seasons in Norwegian bandy
1993 in bandy
1994 in bandy
Band
Band